The 1949 Ford is a line of cars produced by Ford from the 1949 to 1951 model years.  The successor to the prewar 1941 Ford, the model line was the first full-size Ford designed after World War II, becoming the first Ford car line released after the deaths of Edsel Ford and Henry Ford.  From 1946 to 1948, each of the American Big Three concentrated on the restoration of car production, offering updated versions of their 1941-1942 model lines.  Released in June 1948, the 1949 Ford was the first major "postwar" American car line, beating Chevrolet to market by six months and Plymouth by nine.

In response to its design, the model line would become called the "Shoebox Ford", denoting its slab-sided "ponton" design.  While the design theme had been in use since the late 1920s to streamline automobiles, the 1949 Ford marked its widest-scale use, removing running boards entirely and integrating front and rear fenders into a single, smooth body form.

Following the 1948 introduction of the Ford F-Series line of trucks, the Ford line was now offered solely as a car.  In another change, Ford introduced stand-alone model nameplates for 1950.  Designed by artist Frank L. Engle, the Ford crest emblem made its first appearance for 1950; in various forms, the emblem was used through the 1991 model year.  In other firsts, this generation marked the first use of keyed ignition and the first automatic transmission option in Ford vehicles.

Model overview 
For 1949, the Ford car line was redesigned from the ground up; only the powertrain and 114-inch wheelbase were retained from the 1941-1948 generation.

The Ford adopted a drop-center ladder frame; to further modernize its design, the transverse-leaf front and rear suspension (a feature in use since the Model T) was retired, replaced by a coil spring independent front suspension and longitudinal rear leaf springs.  The torque tube driveshaft was replaced by a more universally-used Hotchkiss drive shaft.

Carried over from the previous generation, a 226 cubic-inch L-head inline-6 was the standard engine with an optional 239 cubic-inch Flathead V8.

Model history 
The 1949 Ford debuted at a gala at the Waldorf-Astoria Hotel in New York City in June 1948, with a carousel of the new model line complemented by a revolving demonstration of the new chassis; the new integrated steel structure was advertised as a "lifeguard body".  Though wood was again used for external body panels, the "woody" station wagon adopted a steel inner body structure.  To increase its body rigidity, the frame of the convertible received an "X member" reinforcement.

1949 
Alongside the redesign of the car, Ford updated its model nomenclature for 1949.  The previous Custom, De Luxe, and Super De Luxe names were replaced by new Standard and Custom trims, with Tudor and Fordor sedans (two-door and four-door, respectively), fastback Club Coupe and Business Coupe (the latter, rear seat delete), Convertible Club Coupe, and two-door Station Wagon styles.  In the center of the "Bullet-nose" grille emblem, Ford embossed either a "6" or an "8" on top of a red circle, denoting the fitment of an inline-6 or V8 engine.

While using a different body than Lincoln-Mercury, Ford Motor Company used ponton styling across all three of its divisions for 1949, with the Ford sharing similar styling as the Mercury Eight and the Lincoln.  The center-mounted "Bullet-nose" grille became a styling element adopted by Studebaker for the 1950 facelift of the Studebaker Starlight.  During the 1950s, the slab-sided exterior design would go on to influence many European manufacturers, including Mercedes Benz, Borgward, Austin, Volvo and many others.

For 1949, Ford returned to first place among American manufacturers, selling 1,118,740 Ford cars.  While bolstered by an extended 16-month model year, the 1949 Ford was met with success.

1950 

For 1950, the Ford saw minor changes, primarily to the exterior.  In a badging change, the "FORD" lettering was replaced by an all-new crest badge; in various forms, Ford used a crest emblem on its full-size line for the next four decades.  The trim nomenclature underwent revision, as Standard and Custom became Deluxe and Custom Deluxe, respectively.  A Deluxe Business Coupe served as the most affordable Ford line.  In response to negative consumer feedback, the door latch mechanism underwent multiple safety upgrades.

To compete with the Chevrolet Bel Air hardtop, Ford introduced the Ford Crestliner "sport sedan".  The first stand-alone American Ford nameplate, the Crestliner was a premium variant of the Tudor, fitted with two-tone paint and a vinyl roof.  The two-door station wagon was renamed the Ford Country Squire; in a functional upgrade, the station wagon received flat-folding rear seats.

1951 
For 1951, the Ford underwent several revisions, distinguished externally by the introduction of a "dual-bullet" grille.  The Victoria name (last used for 1934) returned for a two-door hardtop, giving Ford a competitor against the Chevrolet Bel Air and the Plymouth Belvedere; the Tudor-based Crestliner also made a return.  Outselling the Bel Air by nearly 10%, the Ford Victoria was a marketplace success.

Alongside the Victoria, Crestliner, and Country Squire, the Ford sedan line underwent minor trim revisions, with Custom Deluxe becoming Custom.

Introduced in November 1950 as an option, the three-speed Ford-O-Matic became the first automatic transmission offered in a Ford vehicle.  In a functional upgrade, Ford replaced the starter button with a keyed ignition.

Meteor (Canada) 

For 1949, Ford of Canada introduced the Meteor brand, intended as an entry-level brand to be marketed within the Lincoln-Mercury dealership network; in smaller communities, the two brands did not share dealership networks.  Using a Ford body, chassis, and V8 drivetrain with a Mercury grille (and brand-specific trim), Meteor gave Lincoln-Mercury a lower-price vehicle, effectively giving Ford Canada a brand to compete against Pontiac and Dodge.

For 1949 to 1951, Meteor-brand vehicles shared their model names with Ford vehicles, including a Custom Deluxe Victoria coupe.

Australian production

The 1949 Ford V8 generation was also produced by Ford Australia from 1949 to 1951, serving the Australian market.  Alongside a right-hand drive Fordor 4-door sedan, a two-door coupe utility was produced; the latter was developed specifically for sale in Australia.

By 1950, locally-produced models of Ford Australia had adopted a level of 80% Australian-sourced content.

Ford Forty-Nine (2001) 

For 2001, Ford debuted the Ford Forty-Nine concept car at the 2001 North American International Auto Show.  Designed by J Mays and Chip Foose (designer of the Plymouth Prowler), the concept car was intended as a design successor to the revived Ford Thunderbird.  Derived on the chassis of the Lincoln LS (and sharing its V8 engine with both the LS and the Thunderbird), the Forty-Nine was developed as a modern interpretation of the 1949 Ford Club Coupe; doing away with the "bullet-nose", the two-door adopted an all-glass roof.

In a fashion similar to the Volkswagen New Beetle, Audi TT, Ford Thunderbird, and Chrysler PT Cruiser, the Ford Forty-Nine was intended as a preview of a possible production vehicle.  Alongside the glass-roof coupe, Ford also produced a (non-running) Forty-Nine convertible.  After the disappointing launch of the Ford Thunderbird, Ford ended further development on a production version of the Forty-Nine.

See also 
 Ford Zephyr Mark I
 Ford Taunus P1
 Standard 10

References

Sources

External links

1949
Cars introduced in 1948
Cars introduced in 1949
Motor vehicles manufactured in the United States